Eucalyptus cadens, commonly known as the tumble-down swamp gum or Warby Range swamp-gum is a small to medium-sized tree that is endemic to a small area in north-eastern Victoria, Australia. It has rough, compacted bark on the trunk and larger branches, smooth bark above, narrow elliptic to lance-shaped adult leaves, flower buds in groups of seven, white flowers and conical fruit.

Description
The bark on the lower  of the trunk is rough, compacted and greyish brown to black. The higher parts of the trunk and branches have some greyish green bark, often with a few ribbons of shed bark. Flowering occurs between March and June and the flowers are white. The valves protrude beyond the rim of the capsule.

Taxonomy and naming
Eucalyptus cadens was first formally described in 1989 by Barbara Briggs and Michael Crisp from a specimen at "the eastern foot of the Warby Range, between Wangaratta and Glenrowan". The specific epithet (cadens) is the present participle of the Latin word cado meaning "to fall", hence "falling", referring to the leaning habit of this species.

Distribution and habitat
Tumble-down swamp gum grows in woodlands, often in or around springs, soaks and waterbodies in the south-eastern foothills of the Pilot Range near Beechworth and Wooragee and in the eastern foothills of the Warby Range.

Conservation
Eucalyptus cadens is classified as "vulnerable" under the Australian Government Environment Protection and Biodiversity Conservation Act 1999 and the Victorian Government Flora and Fauna Guarantee Act 1988. The main threats to the species include grazing by domestic stock, weed invasion and changes in hydrology.

References

cadens
Myrtales of Australia
Flora of Victoria (Australia)
Trees of Australia
Taxa named by Michael Crisp
Plants described in 1989
Taxa named by Barbara G. Briggs